The 1965 European Women's Artistic Gymnastics Championships were held in Sofia from May 22–23, 1965.

Medalists

Results

All-around

Vault

Uneven bars

Balance beam

Floor

References

1965
International gymnastics competitions hosted by Bulgaria
1965 in Bulgarian women's sport
Euro